Kandice Shaw (née Olivieri, born 16 April 1991) is a former field hockey player from Australia, who played as a forward.

Personal life
Kandice Shaw was born and raised in Gold Coast, Queensland.

Career

Domestic hockey
Until her retirement from representative hockey in 2017, Shaw competed for her home state, Queensland, in domestic hockey competitions.

In Hockey Australia's former premier domestic competition, the Australian Hockey League (AHL), Shaw was a member of the QLD Scorchers. She represented the team for three seasons, in 2011, 2012 and 2013. At the 2013 edition, she won her first and only national title.

International hockey

Hockeyroos
Shaw was first included in the Hockeyroos squad in 2011, following a 60 player training camp in Perth. Following her introduction to the squad, Shaw made her debut less than a month later during a Four-Nations Tournament in Mendoza. She continued appearing for the national team throughout 2011 until she was relegated to the development squad in June.

In 2013, Shaw returned to the national team during a test series against Korea in Perth.

International goals

References

External links
 

1991 births
Living people
Australian female field hockey players
Female field hockey forwards
Sportswomen from Queensland
20th-century Australian women
21st-century Australian women